The Republican Guard (or GR), also called the Presidential Guard (or PR), is nominally part of the Central African Armed Forces (FACA) but is directly subordinated to the President of the Central African Republic, for whom it provides security.

History
During the leadership of President François Bozizé the guard largely consisted of members of his same tribe, "patriots" who helped him seize power during the 2003 Central African Republic coup d'état, and was estimated to number some 800 men. They have been accused of numerous assaults on the civil population, such as terror, aggression, sexual violence. Since the outbreak of the civil war and ethnic violence in 2012 with the overthrow of Bozizé, many members of the guard have joined the Seleka coalition. Since 2008 they had received training from South African and Sudanese troops, with support from Belgium and Germany, although since then the leadership has been cautious about significantly reforming the guard.

Civil War
Since the civil war, transitional president Michel Djotodia attempted to reform the presidential guard, which was staffed by his militia. Chinese instructors provided training to the presidential guard and other internal security forces in 2018.

Status
Its current status is unknown, although Prime Minister Catherine Samba-Panza was known to rely on foreign security guards, particularly those from Rwanda. Currently President Faustin-Archange Touadéra is also protected by Rwandan troops. Some sources suggest that a Central African Presidential Guard still exists, however, and that it has been trained by Rwandan commandos.

In May 2019, a unit of the presidential guard was commissioned after being trained by Russian military instructors, the groupement spécial chargé de la protection républicaine (GSPR).

References

Military of the Central African Republic
Guards regiments